If Tomorrow Comes is a 1971 American TV film. It was originally entitled The Glass Hammer then My Husband, the Enemy but was retitled after protests.

Plot
An American girl marries a Japanese American just before the attack on Pearl Harbor.

Cast
Patty Duke as Eileen Phillips
Frank Michael Liu as David Tayaneka
Anne Baxter as Miss Cramer
James Whitmore as Frank Phillips
Pat Hingle as Sheriff
Mako as Tadashi

Reception
The Los Angeles Times called it "worthy, painful".

References

External links
If Tomorrow Comes at IMDb
If Tomorrow Comes at TCMDB

1971 television films
1971 films
ABC Movie of the Week
Films directed by George McCowan